György Rozgonyi may refer to:

 György Rozgonyi (fencer) (1890–1967), Hungarian fencer
 György Rozgonyi (ice hockey) (born 1943), Hungarian ice hockey player